Sherman L. Hill (December 4, 1911 – March 1984) is a former Republican member of the Pennsylvania House of Representatives.
 Hill was born in Manor Township, Lancaster County, PA. He graduated from Penn Manor High School, Millersville State College, and Temple University. Hill was elected to the Pennsylvania House of Representatives as a republican in 1965. He was then reelected for 4 consecutive terms.

References

Republican Party members of the Pennsylvania House of Representatives
1911 births
1984 deaths
20th-century American politicians
People from Millersville, Pennsylvania